Classification 9–12 of the WABA League took place between 3 March 2022 and it will end on 16 March 2022.

25 September 2021 Feniks Pale has withdraws from the 2021–22 WABA League. As per the Official Basketball Rules, all games were awarded to their respective opponents with a score of 20-0. Furthermore, the forfeiting team Feniks will receive 0 classification points in the standings.

Ninth place game

Game 1

Game 2

Eleventh place game

Game 1

Game 2

References

External links
Official website

Classification 9–12